Thomas Tuchel (born 29 August 1973) is a German professional football manager and former player who last managed Premier League club Chelsea. 
 
Born in Krumbach, Tuchel retired at age 25 after a chronic knee cartilage injury; in 2000, he began his coaching career as a youth coach at VfB Stuttgart, and in 2009, after a one-year period at FC Augsburg II, he was hired by Mainz 05. He departed Mainz in 2014 and was appointed at fellow Bundesliga club Borussia Dortmund in 2015, where he won the DFB-Pokal before being dismissed in 2017. He was hired by French club Paris Saint-Germain in 2018, where he won two league titles, including a domestic quadruple in his second season, and guided the club to its first UEFA Champions League final before being dismissed in 2020.

Tuchel was appointed by Chelsea in 2021 and won the Champions League in his debut season. He was dismissed as manager in September 2022.

Playing career
Born in Krumbach, Bavaria, Tuchel starred as a member of local club, the TSV Krumbach, coached by his father Rudolf. Tuchel moved to the academy at FC Augsburg in 1988, however, he never appeared for the first team, being released when he turned 19. There, coach Heiner Schuhmann's evaluation of Tuchel during his tenure at Augsburg noted he "was a passionate player who gave his all on the pitch, but had few friends among his teammates because he was exacting and demanding". After he was released, Tuchel signed for 2. Bundesliga side Stuttgarter Kickers in 1992.

Tuchel played eight games during the 1992–93 season. After the 1993–94 season, he was dropped from Kickers' first team, and joined Regionalliga Süd side SSV Ulm, coached by Hermann Badstuber, the father of Holger Badstuber, whom Tuchel would later manage at youth level. Playing as a central defender, he played for SSV Ulm until being forced to retire in 1998, at the age of 24, after suffering a knee cartilage injury.

Coaching career

Early career
Tuchel began his coaching career in 2000, hired by Ralf Rangnick as youth team coach at VfB Stuttgart, where he aided in the development of future first team players, namely Mario Gómez and Holger Badstuber. He coached the under-19 side of the club to the Under 19 Bundesliga title in the 2004–05 campaign. He left after that season, as the club tired of his personality and chose not to renew his contract. In 2005, Tuchel returned to Augsburg, with club sporting director Andreas Rettig noting the club's admiration of Tuchel's tactical discipline led to him being appointed youth team coordinator. He was hired despite lacking a UEFA Pro Licence, which he gained in a six-and-a-half month course in Cologne under Erich Rutemöller. Tuchel held the position as coordinator for three years, transitioning into management after accepting the position as first team coach at FC Augsburg II for the 2007–08 season. With Augsburg II, he coached a team which included Julian Nagelsmann, himself an injury-prone defender, who transitioned to a coaching career after Tuchel instructed him to scout for the club in 2008. Tuchel also garnered a reputation for his combustibility towards referees during games, often receiving fines from the Bavarian Football Association (BFV) as a result. At the end of the 2007–08 season, Tuchel's Augsburg II finished fourth.

Mainz 05
Tuchel's time as the coach of Augsburg II impressed many top-level German clubs, and he went on to be appointed by Bundesliga club Mainz 05 in 2009. Having signed an initial two-year contract, he was promoted into the role after acting as a youth coach at Mainz for the previous 12 months, during which he had won the Under 19 Bundesliga with the under-19 side. According to club executive Christian Heidel, Tuchel's perfectionism, going as far as to analyze pitch maintenance prior to a game against Olympiacos, contributed to his eventual appointment.

The composition of the squad was seen in Tuchel's tactical approach at Mainz, as despite possessing technically inferior players, he instructed them to utilize long distribution and focus on pressing off the ball, typically overloading one portion of the opposition half in order to create less space to generate counter-attacking opportunities, as relentless high-pressure would create chances by dispossessing or forcing errors from the opposition. An initial disciplinarian, Tuchel reportedly forbid his players to leave the canteen while others were still eating, deeming it ill-mannered. His tactics of pressing and positional play led Mainz to a ninth-placed finish in his first season as manager. In the following campaign, Tuchel's Mainz enjoyed a perfect start to the season, winning seven games in their first seven, including an away victory over Bayern Munich. This coincided with Tuchel's employ of René Marić and Martin Rafelt, founders of the tactics blog Spielverlagerung, to compile occasional scouting reports on Mainz's opponents. Tuchel eventually led the team to a fifth-placed finish as the club improved by 11 points to qualify for the third-qualifying round of the 2011–12 UEFA Europa League. Only four Bundesliga sides scored more goals than Mainz in the 2010–11 campaign, who had scored 52 goals in total. Of those goals, fifteen had been scored by rising star André Schürrle, and ten by Sami Allagui, who was a key part of Tuchel's pressing machine.

Mainz fell to a thirteenth-placed finish the following season, having notably lost Schürrle to Bayer Leverkusen in the summer. Allagui's lack of form added to Mainz's issues in attack, although new signing Eric Maxim Choupo-Moting was able to score ten goals, and midfielder Julian Baumgartlinger's organization and discipline helped the team and "marked him out" as a future club captain. Mainz suffered an early exit in the Europa League, and ended the season with 39 points, the lowest total during Tuchel's spell at the club. In the 2012–13 season, Mainz would go on to repeat their thirteenth-placed finish from the season prior. Despite a poor start and end to the season, there were significantly fewer struggles than in the previous campaign, and the team finished six points below seventh place. Ádám Szalai, who netted thirteen times, solved the goal-scoring issues up front, while Nicolai Müller and Andreas Ivanschitz scored eight and seven goals respectively. Mainz was knocked out in the quarter-finals of the DFB-Pokal. In what would turn out to be his final season with the club, Tuchel led Mainz to a seventh-place finish, qualifying for the group stages of the 2014–15 UEFA Europa League. At the beginning of the season, he had brought in Japanese forward Shinji Okazaki. Deployed in a central striking role, he went on to have a prolific season, scoring 15 goals in the Bundesliga, a record for a Japanese player.

Despite approaches by Schalke 04 and Bayer Leverkusen for his services in the latter-half of the 2013–14 season, Tuchel remained at Mainz until the end of the campaign. However, in May 2014, he asked to be released from his contract, later stating that he "couldn't see how [the team] could reinvent [itself] once more the coming summer." Tuchel explained that he had already made the decision to leave Mainz at the end of the season in autumn of 2013. Mainz initially refused to release him from his contract, but on 11 May 2014, he was allowed to step down. Tuchel concluded his Mainz career with a record of 72 wins, 46 draws, and 64 losses, from 182 games, with a win percentage of 39.56%.

Borussia Dortmund
In April 2015, coach Jürgen Klopp announced that he would leave Borussia Dortmund following the 2014–15 season. Dortmund, inquiring over the availability of various coaches, quickly decided on Tuchel, eager to incorporate a similar press-based footballing philosophy made a club trademark under Klopp. Shortly thereafter, Tuchel's appointment as the club's new head coach for the following season occurred on 19 April 2015. Signing a three-year deal effective from 1 July, he returned to coaching after over a year without a club. Both Klopp and Tuchel completed the same path of moving from Mainz to Dortmund.

Joining at the beginning of the summer window, Tuchel was eager to avoid speculation and off-the-pitch distractions. He addressed the issue of star players who were in a dilemma between staying and leaving, rapidly convincing them that Dortmund could meet their ambitions. After securing the futures of several important players, Tuchel identified targets that could help the squad compete and "bridge the gap at the top". Dortmund and Tuchel's approach was to build upon Klopp's foundations, keeping the team's core with shrewd additions. This policy resulted in the acquisitions of Roman Bürki and Julian Weigl, players who were not considered stars, but had potential to be so, while Gonzalo Castro joined the club for €11 million. Weigl was frequently utilized by Tuchel behind two central midfielders in a 4–1–4–1 formation, and along with the other two midfielders, he would work the ball until Dortmund could force an overload in space out wide, attacking with rapidity from there. Tuchel also utilized a 4–2–3–1 formation at Dortmund; players like Shinji Kagawa, Henrikh Mkhitaryan, and the deep-dropping Pierre-Emerick Aubameyang would make overloads in pockets of space in-between the lines. Weigl would sit back in front of the defence, while the other central midfielder, which was İlkay Gündoğan when fit, pushed up forward. Although unbeaten in his first fourteen matches at Borussia Dortmund, Tuchel and his team ended trophyless in the 2015–16 season, despite an appearance in the 2016 DFB-Pokal Final, in which they lost to Bayern Munich on penalties. The team also suffered elimination at the quarter-final stage of the UEFA Europa League at the hands of Liverpool, who were now coached by Klopp. However, the campaign was notable for further promotions of youth talent, with American teenager Christian Pulisic largely starring during the latter stages of the season. Dortmund scored 82 goals in the 2015–16 Bundesliga, a club record, and the team's average league possession of 61% and an average pass accuracy of 85% were significant improvements from the team's counterpressing days with Klopp. Their point total of 78 was also the second highest in club history, and would have secured a league title in all but three of the previous 52 seasons. Dortmund finished second in the Bundesliga, securing UEFA Champions League football.

In preparation for the following campaign, Dortmund spent heavily on player purchases, spending a total of €109.75 million in the transfer market; the club was looking to find replacements for important players Mats Hummels, Gündoğan, and Mkhitaryan. Ousmane Dembélé, Marc Bartra, Emre Mor, Mario Götze and Raphaël Guerreiro were notably brought in for a total sum of €64 million. Guerreiro, signed following his successful time at UEFA Euro 2016, was shifted from left-back to midfield by Tuchel. Dortmund went on to return the final of the DFB-Pokal, where Tuchel won his first ever major honor as a coach, as well as the club's first trophy in five years, as they beat Eintracht Frankfurt 2–1, with goals from both Dembélé and Aubameyang. The team finished the season third in the Bundesliga, and was eliminated in the quarter-finals of the Champions League by Monaco.

Despite the victory, the DFB-Pokal was to be Tuchel's only honour with the club, as he was dismissed three days later on 30 May 2017. His tenure as first-team coach was marred with controversy, with a strained relationship with the club's hierarchy, notably CEO Hans-Joachim Watzke, who described Tuchel as a "difficult person". Tuchel publicly criticized Watzke after he agreed to UEFA's demand that the club play their Champions League quarter-final first leg match against Monaco on 12 April 2017, one day after the team's bus being bombed. He also reportedly expressed discontent over transfer activity, with Watzke sanctioning the departures of Hummels, Gündoğan, and Mkhitaryan, despite guarantees they would not leave. Tuchel also maintained fractured relations with club stalwarts Roman Weidenfeller, Neven Subotić, and Jakub Błaszczykowski, and aimed to replace the trio, which Watzke disagreed with. Tuchel aimed to sign defender Ömer Toprak in 2016, a move allegedly blocked by Watzke and chief scout Sven Mislintat, the latter of whom was effectively banished from the training ground after an argument with Tuchel. Moreover, the club also chased midfielder Óliver Torres behind Tuchel's back in 2017.

Tuchel left Dortmund with a record of 68 wins, 23 draws, and 17 defeats in 108 games, with a win percentage of 62.96%.

Paris Saint-Germain
In May 2018, Tuchel signed a two-year contract with Paris Saint-Germain (PSG), replacing Unai Emery. He rejected Bayern Munich to join the club.

Tuchel's first move in the transfer market was the permanent signing of Monaco forward Kylian Mbappé for a fee of €180m on 1 July. To offset this large acquisition, and to adhere to UEFA Financial Fair Play regulations, Tuchel sanctioned the departure of several players, including first-team players Yuri Berchiche and Javier Pastore, as well as promising youngster Gonçalo Guedes. After also generating profits through the sales of other bit-part players, the club signed free agent goalkeeper Gianluigi Buffon on 6 July. A month later, the team signed German defender Thilo Kehrer for €37m, and PSG concluded their activity in the summer transfer market by signing Spanish left-back Juan Bernat for €15m on deadline day, while also reuniting Tuchel with former player Choupo-Moting. Despite these acquisitions, Tuchel publicly lamented the club's inability to improve at both full-back areas.

Tuchel's first match in charge also yielded his first honor at the club, as PSG defeated Monaco 4–0 to win the Trophée des Champions on 4 August. He also saw victory in his first league game, as the club defeated Caen 3–0 eight days later. After enjoying a brief unbeaten record, Tuchel suffered his first defeat in Paris on 18 September, losing 3–2 away to Liverpool in a Champions League group stage game. However, by November, Tuchel would break the record for the most wins to start to a domestic league season, as he registered twelve straight victories. The record was later extended to include two additional victories, prior to the club ending its 100% start to the season on 2 December, after PSG drew 2–2 away to Bordeaux. Tuchel then guided Paris Saint-Germain to top spot in the club's Champions League group, with a 4–1 win over Red Star Belgrade on 12 December. By securing victory over Nantes on 22 December, Tuchel also broke the record for most points by Christmas in Ligue 1, with 47 after 17 games.

In January 2019, Tuchel was eliminated from his first competition at PSG, falling to Guingamp on 9 January, in the quarter-finals of the Coupe de la Ligue. However, he would defeat the same opposition by a margin of 9–0 ten days later in the league, the biggest home win in PSG's history. Prior to deadline day, on 29 January, the club delved into the winter transfer market to sign Argentine midfielder Leandro Paredes for a rumored fee of €40m. However, these transfers failed to progress the club in Europe, as PSG crashed out of the Champions League in the first knockout round against Manchester United. The club secured a 2–0 victory away from home in the first leg, but lost 3–1 at home, exiting the competition on away goals. With only the league and the Coupe de France to play for, PSG won the former on 21 April, six gameweeks before the end of the season, marking Tuchel's first league title victory as a coach. Six days later, Paris Saint-Germain lost the 2019 Coupe de France Final to Rennes on penalties, which occurred after a stretch of three consecutive league defeats: PSG's worst showing since 2012.

After the season's end, Tuchel signed a one-year contract extension, scheduled to end in 2021. In his second transfer window, Tuchel strayed from recruiting stars, and instead, pushed for the recruitment of hardworking Spanish midfielders Ander Herrera and Pablo Sarabia, as well as youth prospect Mitchel Bakker. Meanwhile, the club let go of strong personalities in Buffon, Dani Alves, and Adrien Rabiot, and profited from the sales of several fringe players, including Moussa Diaby, Timothy Weah, and Grzegorz Krychowiak. Additionally, the club signed central defender Abdou Diallo from Tuchel's old club Borussia Dortmund, combative midfielder Idrissa Gueye, and completed the transfer of goalkeeper Keylor Navas, as well as a loan move for forward Mauro Icardi, on deadline day. With a number of additional sales, this marked the first transfer window since PSG's takeover by Qatar Sports Investments in 2012 whereby the club has made profit in the transfer market.

Tuchel began his second season at PSG by retaining the Trophée des Champions on 3 August 2019, in a 2–1 win over Rennes. He also won his first league game of the season, defeating Nîmes 3–0 at home. However, PSG lost 2–1 against Rennes in the club's second league game. In the club's first game in that season's UEFA Champions League, Tuchel received praise for his tactical setup as PSG defeated thirteen-time winners Real Madrid 3–0 at home; the victory occurred without recognized first-team players Neymar, Edinson Cavani, and Mbappé. He later guided the team to qualification to the first knockout stage with two group games to spare, following a 1–0 win over Belgian club Club Brugge on 6 November. Just under three weeks later, Tuchel led the club to top spot in their group after securing a 2–2 draw against Real Madrid. The club then embarked on an unbeaten run, recording a number of high scoring victories; PSG scored six goals against Linas-Montlhéry and Saint-Étienne in the domestic cup competitions in January, while they scored five against Montpellier in the league. Notably, the latter game contained controversy, as Tuchel was seen to be in a heated conversation with Mbappé following his substitution.

On 18 February, PSG sustained a 2–1 defeat against Tuchel's former club Dortmund in the first leg in the round of 16 in the Champions League. Under a month later, Tuchel guided the club to the last eight, overturning the deficit in a 2–0 victory at home in the second leg. This was the club's first game behind closed doors due to the COVID-19 pandemic; this was the reason the domestic league was canceled on 30 April, while their Champions League fixtures, the Coupe de France, and the Coupe de la Ligue finals were postponed. PSG returned to competitive football on 24 July, winning the Coupe de France after beating Saint-Étienne 1–0 in the final. The game was marred by Kylian Mbappé suffering an ankle sprain, which ruled him out for three weeks. On 31 July, PSG defeated Lyon 6–5 on penalties in the 2020 Coupe de la Ligue Final to complete a domestic treble. On 12 August, PSG scored two late goals to beat Atalanta 2–1 in the quarter-finals of the Champions League, marking the club's first appearance in the semi-finals of the competition since the 1994–95 season. In the semi-final, PSG defeated RB Leipzig 3–0 to reach their first ever Champions League Final, and their first European final since 1997. They would go onto lose the match by a single goal to Bayern Munich on 23 August.

In his third transfer window, PSG released a number of players, including club stalwarts Thiago Silva and Cavani. Meanwhile, Mauro Icardi's loan was made permanent for €50 million, and the club supplemented this with the loan acquisitions of Alessandro Florenzi, Danilo Pereira, and Moise Kean. PSG began their league title defence with a 1–0 defeat to newly promoted Lens away on 10 September 2020; the club were missing newly-appointed captain Marquinhos, Icardi, Neymar, Mbappé, Navas, Paredes, and Ángel Di María due to COVID-19 protocols or for testing positive for COVID-19. The club went onto lose their second league game by the same scoreline in Le Classique, marking the first time PSG lost their opening two league games since the 1984–85 season. The game became infamous for its disciplinary issues, with 17 cards shown (the most in a single Ligue 1 game in the 21st century), while five were sent off following an injury-time brawl. Tuchel secured the club's first win of the league season by defeating Metz 1–0 on 16 September, although the game was marred by another red card to PSG. This began a streak of 8 straight wins, before succumbing to a 3–2 away defeat to Monaco on 20 November; another game where PSG saw a red card. After only managing to secure 3 more league wins, and with PSG third in Ligue 1, behind Lyon and eventual winners Lille, Tuchel was dismissed on 24 December, despite placing top of their Champions League group. His firing occurred a day after beating Strasbourg 4–0, surprising many at the club, including assistant coach Zsolt Lőw.

Tuchel's tenure at Paris Saint-Germain was marred by a fractured relationship with the club's hierarchy. In an interview with German television station Sport 1, he said he felt "[more like] a politician in sport" than a coach. These comments, as well as his previous criticism over the club's transfer activity, were condemned by PSG's sporting director Leonardo, who said Tuchel "[must] respect the people above [him]", and labelled the comments as damaging for the club. Tuchel and Leonardo reportedly fell out over the signing of defensive midfielder Danilo Pereira, with the coach requesting a central defender; in response, Tuchel often fielded Pereira as a central defender.

Tuchel departed Paris Saint-Germain with a record of 95 wins, 13 draws, and 19 defeats in 127 games, with the best win percentage in Ligue 1 history (75.6%) and the highest average of points per game (2.37, tied with his predecessor Emery). Before leaving Paris, Tuchel facilitated the medical expenses for his housemaid's child's heart surgery, and enabled her to return home to the Philippines by purchasing her family a property in the country.

Chelsea

On 26 January 2021, Tuchel signed an 18-month contract (with the option for an additional year) with Premier League club Chelsea, replacing Frank Lampard. He became the first German to be appointed as head coach of the club. Although expressing a desire to not come in mid-season so as to have a pre-season with his new team, Tuchel accepted the position after Ralf Rangnick rejected the proposal of interim head coach.

Tuchel took charge of his first match the following day, a goalless draw at home against Wolverhampton Wanderers, a match that set the record for most possession (78.9%) and passes completed (820) for a manager's first Premier League game. Tuchel won his first game on 31 January, defeating Burnley 2–0 at home, and then won his first London derby (and his first away game) by defeating Tottenham Hotspur 1–0 on 4 February. On 11 February, Tuchel guided Chelsea to the quarter-finals of the FA Cup with a 1–0 away win over EFL Championship side Barnsley, extending his unbeaten run to five games. This run was eventually extended to eight games after Chelsea defeated Atlético Madrid 1–0 away in the first leg of the round of 16 in the UEFA Champions League, with Olivier Giroud scoring an overhead kick. This marked Tuchel's first European victory as Chelsea manager.

On 8 March, Tuchel's unbeaten run extended to eleven games after a 2–0 home league win over Everton, becoming the first head coach in Premier League history to keep consecutive home clean sheets in their first five home matches. After a 2–0 home victory against Atlético Madrid in the second leg of the Round of 16 in the Champions League on 17 March, Tuchel extended his unbeaten run to 13 games, setting the record for the longest unbeaten run by a new head coach in Chelsea's history. This was considered to be due to the change to a three-man defence and partly attributed to a pragmatic approach to games; Tuchel's team took as many shots as Lampard's team per game (13.8 v 13.9), but created fewer chances, leading to 1.1 goals scored on average per game, compared to 2.1 under Lampard. He was then awarded his first Premier League Manager of the Month in October. The unbeaten run concluded at 14 games, with a 5–2 home defeat against West Bromwich Albion on 3 April.

On 17 April, courtesy of a Hakim Ziyech goal, Tuchel led Chelsea to the FA Cup Final, defeating league leaders Manchester City 1–0 in the semi-final; Chelsea would eventually lose the final 1–0 to Leicester City. Tuchel also guided Chelsea to the Champions League Final following a 3–1 aggregate win over Real Madrid in the semi-finals, becoming the first coach to reach consecutive finals with two different clubs. He eventually led Chelsea to European glory with a 1–0 win over Manchester City in the final. Following this, Tuchel signed a contract extension, keeping him at the club until 2024.

In his first transfer window at Chelsea to prepare for the 2021–22 season, the club signed experienced goalkeeper Marcus Bettinelli on a free transfer from West London rivals Fulham on 28 July, thus marking Tuchel's first signing as Chelsea head coach. Tuchel also began incorporating academy player Trevoh Chalobah into the first team, and Chelsea then later re-signed Romelu Lukaku for a club-record £97.5 million (€115 million). He also signed Saúl Ñíguez on a season-long loan from Atlético Madrid (which included an option to buy for £30 million) on deadline day. Chelsea began the season with an eight-game unbeaten streak, winning the UEFA Super Cup, before suffering their first defeat of the season, against Manchester City, on 25 September. On 20 October, Chelsea recorded their highest scoring victory under Tuchel, a 4–0 home victory over Malmö in the Champions League; this was bettered three days later following a 7–0 thumping of league strugglers Norwich City. The club then embarked on a 12 match unbeaten run in all competitions, which culminated in a 3–2 away loss against West Ham United on 4 December. A month later, Tuchel led Chelsea to the 2022 EFL Cup Final following a 3–0 aggregate semi-final victory over city rivals Tottenham Hotspur; Chelsea would go onto lose the final against Liverpool on penalties. On 12 February, after a 2–1 extra time win over Palmeiras, Tuchel won the FIFA Club World Cup, Chelsea's first Club World Cup win.

After a six game win streak in all competitions, Chelsea lost 4–1 at home to newly promoted Brentford on 2 April; the club then registered their highest scoring away win under Tuchel by winning 6–0 at Southampton a week later. However, on 12 April, Chelsea lost 5–4 on aggregate after extra time against Real Madrid and were knocked out of the Champions League, following which, Tuchel criticized several refereeing decisions, including a disallowed goal for Marcos Alonso and referee Szymon Marciniak's "smiling and laughing" with Real Madrid coach Carlo Ancelotti at the game's conclusion. Four days later, Tuchel led Chelsea to their second successive FA Cup Final with a 2–0 victory over Crystal Palace. However, Chelsea went on to lose to Liverpool in the Final on penalties, repeating the outcome of that year's EFL Cup Final three months prior.

To prepare for the 2022–23 season, Tuchel and Chelsea had spent over £250 million – the highest spend in that season's Premier League and a British record for spending in one transfer window – on Raheem Sterling, Kalidou Koulibaly, Gabriel Slonina, Carney Chukwuemeka, Cesare Casadei, and Pierre-Emerick Aubameyang, as well as near club record outlays on Marc Cucurella and Wesley Fofana. The club also secured the loan of Denis Zakaria on transfer deadline day on 31 August. Several first team players also departed, including Antonio Rüdiger and Marcos Alonso, academy graduates Andreas Christensen and Callum Hudson-Odoi (who left on loan), and former heavy money signings Timo Werner and Romelu Lukaku (who left on loan).

The club began their league season with a 1–0 win over Everton on 6 August 2022. Eight days later, Tuchel was sent off after a 2–2 draw against Tottenham Hotspur after an angry confrontation with Antonio Conte at the end of the match. He was fined £35,000 and given a one-match touchline ban by the Football Association (FA) for improper conduct. Tuchel was subsequently handed an additional £20,000 fine after comments suggesting that referee Anthony Taylor should no longer referee Chelsea matches after he made some controversial decisions in the Tottenham game. The FA stated that Tuchel's comments had constituted improper conduct and that they "imply bias, question the integrity of the match referee, and bring the game into disrepute". On 7 September 2022, Tuchel was fired as the team's manager following the club's 1–0 away loss to Dinamo Zagreb in their opening Champions League fixture the previous day (a match attended by new Chelsea chairmen Todd Boehly and Behdad Eghbali); Chelsea also sustained league defeats against Leeds United and Southampton prior to the loss to Dinamo Zagreb.

According to The Athletic, Tuchel was reportedly dissatisfied over his increased involvement in Chelsea's day-to-day transfer activity as a result of the dismissals of club director Marina Granovskaia and technical advisor Petr Čech (with whom Tuchel had a strong working relationship); Tuchel was said to have delegated his presence at recruitment meetings to his agent. Sources close to Tuchel claim he disagreed with the club's transfer strategy and targets, such as not being involved in the loan signing of Zakaria and personally expressing interest in moves for Matthijs de Ligt, Raphinha, Frenkie de Jong, and Presnel Kimpembe. Sources connected with Chelsea claimed Tuchel was inconsistent regarding transfers, expressing both reluctance and support towards potential moves for Gabriel Jesus, Edson Álvarez, Roméo Lavia, and Cristiano Ronaldo.

Tuchel reportedly suffered a breakdown in communication with the owners after the defeat to Leeds on 21 August (after which, discussion arose to relieve Tuchel of his duties), and Boehly was said to have described Tuchel as a "nightmare" to deal with on recruitment to a Premier League executive. Tuchel had also fallen out with and isolated several first team players, such as Hakim Ziyech, Christian Pulisic, Werner, Lukaku, and Hudson-Odoi, from gametime; Tuchel also reportedly argued with Werner following a pre-season defeat to Charlotte on 20 July. On his departure, Tuchel wrote an open letter, detailing he did not anticipate leaving Chelsea "for many years", saying he felt "honoured to have been a part of [the] club's history and the memories of the last 19 months will always have a special place in my heart".

Tuchel departed Chelsea with a record of 60 wins, 24 draws, and 16 defeats in 100 games with a win percentage of 60%, the fourth highest win-rate by a Chelsea manager who managed at least 100 games, after Jose Mourinho (67.03%), Antonio Conte (65.09%), and Carlo Ancelotti (61.09%). Tuchel was succeeded by Graham Potter.

Manager profile

Tactics
Tuchel is known for his tactical knowledge and flexibility as well as his implementation of innovative training methods. During his tenure at Mainz, Tuchel used rondos, cut the corners off the training pitch in an effort to improve passing and movement, and enforced his players to hold tennis balls during defensive drills to attempt to limit unnecessary fouling. A stringent analyst, he once paused a documentary on Pep Guardiola for two hours on the Mainz bus to study a graph which showed Barcelona's passing patterns. He also discussed tactics with Guardiola for four hours in Munich. Tuchel has borrowed training methods from other sports, including archery and kick-boxing; he once made the team spend close to a month training with a handball team. According to Jan Kirchhoff, Tuchel also emphasized psychological training, regularly sharing extracts from newspaper articles or books to his players to challenge their thinking.

With Dortmund, Tuchel often used the 4–1–4–1 and 4–2–3–1 formations; with the former, he made his team force overloads in space out wide, while with the latter, he looked to create overloads in pockets of space in-between the lines of the opposition. At Paris Saint-Germain, Tuchel primarily played a 4–3–3 with plenty of flair to emphasize the attacking capabilities of wide forwards Neymar and Mbappé, although, used up to ten different formations while at the club. An initial disciplinarian, Tuchel implemented bans on eating refined carbohydrates, replacing it with wholemeal pasta and light sauces; he changed this approach after being appointed at PSG. During the 2018–19 season, the forward line, with Neymar and Mbappé flanking central target man Cavani, regularly dropped into the half-space or into wide areas. The team's full-backs would also push up alongside the midfield, in order to attain positional overloads, and players were encouraged to find space between the lines of defense and midfield to disorganize the opposition. Simultaneously, this would disrupt attempts to man-mark Neymar and Mbappé, and create space open behind the defensive line for the pair to run into.

The team's midfield would see the deepest defensive midfielder stick close to the central defenders, who would often be joined by another midfielder who can act as a deep-lying playmaker. These roles were occupied by Marquinhos and Marco Verratti, respectively. The last remaining midfielder would push forward, to stagger attacks and disrupt defensive structure by overloading one side of the opponent's defensive area, setting an overload passing trap. During the 2018–19 and 2019–20 seasons, Di María and Paredes were commonly associated with this role. The team also heavily utilized Gegenpressing, a tactic where, after losing possession of the ball, the team immediately attempts to wins it back, rather than regrouping. This ensures PSG corral the opponent onto one side, before switching play quickly to exploit the weaker side. Tuchel has also been noted for his use of man-marking, tasking Herrera to do so on Thiago in the 2020 Champions League Final.

In the 2018–19 season, following injuries to Neymar, Verratti, and Rabiot, Tuchel sometimes departed from the 4–3–3, to success. In a 4–1 home victory against Rennes in January 2019, PSG lined up in a 4–2–2–2 formation; in possession, one defensive midfielder would drop between the central defenders to create a back three, while the fullbacks pushed forward. This meant the other midfielder would act as a sweeping defensive presence, while the four forwards would stay high and wide, dropping in sporadically to create vertical passing options to break the defensive line. In defense, PSG would retreat to a 5–3–2 formation, and readjust to a 4–4–2 to gegenpress.

At Chelsea, Tuchel was known for making frequent player alterations in his early tenure; he made 39 changes to the starting lineup in 10 Premier League games between January and March 2021. He mostly preferred a 3–4–2–1, with ball progression largely coming from the wingbacks, a position mainly played by Reece James and Ben Chilwell, while also restoring the ostracized Antonio Rüdiger to a first team regular, deploying him as a left centre-back in a back three, despite Rüdiger being right-footed. Sources close to Chelsea noted training sessions feature a light tone, with a wide range of drills including smaller footballs or using hands instead of feet in some games. He also used staggered recovery, such as lighter sessions after big games or rest days altogether. According to Andreas Christensen, in days leading up to games, training intensity typically increases, with focus on possession over tactics, such as three v two passing drills.

Reception
Klopp, his contemporary, commenting on Tuchel's "exceptional" rise through the ranks remarked, "He's an outstanding coach and an outstanding manager". Guardiola also expressed his admiration for Tuchel's footballing philosophy, saying, "He's so creative. One of the few managers I learn from. Excellent in all departments. I enjoy watching his teams, the way he plays [and] his approach."

Nikolče Noveski, who played under Tuchel and Klopp, noted "Tuchel's [management] was interested in fine details; his preparation for games is unparalleled. He is perfectionist, isn't afraid to challenge people and can be direct despite potential conflict". Speaking on his management style, Marcus Bettinelli noted Tuchel emphasizes personableness with playing and non-playing staff, saying, "...whether you're the chef, the bin man or gardener [you can] feel the atmosphere. He likes to ask how your family are, how you're doing. It's small things like that [which] help you feel comfortable".

Sources close to Chelsea noted Tuchel's strong communication skills with players and light tone; to assimilate with the playing squad, Tuchel regularly organized external team outings and activities, including cooking them Weißwürste and pretzels. Writing for The Athletic, Simon Johnson reported such tensions rose at Chelsea, especially with the club's attacking players, with "brutal" criticism for failing to carry out his tactics. This was echoed by Gonzalo Castro, who also played under Tuchel, and said, "[Tuchel] organises everything precisely, down to the last millimetre."

Tuchel is also known as a fierce motivator. At Mainz, during a bike tour up a mountain, Tuchel buried the club badge, saying if the youth team reached the 2009 Under 19 Bundesliga final, he would retrieve it; according to under-19 player Konstantin Fring, "We all had goosebumps. We would have killed someone for him [when he retrieved it]. We wanted to win so much. And we did."

Personal life
As a child, Tuchel was a "huge" fan of football, and his first footballing idol was Hans-Günter Bruns.

Tuchel attended Simpert-Kraemer-Gymnasium and devised tactical strategies in PE volleyball. He graduated from Baden-Württemberg Cooperative State University with a degree in business administration, and worked as a bartender at the Radio Bar in Stuttgart while a student.

Thomas married his wife Sissi in 2009, with whom he has two daughters. In April 2022, it was reported Sissi filed for divorce, citing irreconcilable differences. Tuchel is a polyglot, speaking German, French, English, and Italian. He describes himself as an "imperfect vegetarian" and consumes minimal amounts of alcohol. Tuchel considers himself an avid reader, namely of crime thriller novels and books about architecture and design, and is also a fan of tennis, rock music, and hip hop.

Managerial statistics

Honours

Manager

Borussia Dortmund
DFB-Pokal: 2016–17; runner-up: 2015–16

Paris Saint-Germain
Ligue 1: 2018–19, 2019–20
Coupe de France: 2019–20; runner-up: 2018–19
Coupe de la Ligue: 2019–20	
Trophée des Champions: 2018, 2019
UEFA Champions League runner-up: 2019–20

Chelsea
UEFA Champions League: 2020–21
UEFA Super Cup: 2021
FIFA Club World Cup: 2021
FA Cup runner-up: 2020–21, 2021–22
EFL Cup runner-up: 2021–22

Individual
VDV Bundesliga Coach of the Season: 2015–16
Premier League Manager of the Month: March 2021, October 2021
German Football Manager of the Year: 2021
UEFA Men's Coach of the Year: 2020–21
IFFHS Men's World's Best Club Coach: 2021
The Best FIFA Football Coach: 2021

References

External links

 
Profile at kickersarchiv.de 

1973 births
Living people
People from Günzburg (district)
Sportspeople from Swabia (Bavaria)
Baden-Württemberg Cooperative State University alumni
Footballers from Bavaria
German footballers
Association football defenders
FC Augsburg players
Stuttgarter Kickers players
SSV Ulm 1846 players
2. Bundesliga players
German football managers
1. FSV Mainz 05 managers
Borussia Dortmund managers
Paris Saint-Germain F.C. managers
Chelsea F.C. managers
Bundesliga managers
Ligue 1 managers
Premier League managers
UEFA Champions League winning managers
German expatriate football managers
German expatriate sportspeople in France
German expatriate sportspeople in England
Expatriate football managers in France
Expatriate football managers in England
Association football coaches